Folkins is a surname. Notable people with the surname include:
Corinna Folkins (1918–1998), American lawn bowler, wife of Dick
Dick Folkins (1917–1987), American lawn bowler, husband of Corinna
Jeff Folkins, American physicist
Lee Folkins (born 1939), American football player
Lloyd Folkins (1913–1994), Canadian politician